The Karst Trail is a marked and signed footpath that runs for over 250 kilometres between Förste in Lower Saxony and Pölsfeld in Saxony-Anhalt through the karst landscape of the South Harz in Germany. 

The path runs past a number of areas of natural beauty, including caves like the Heimkehle and the Barbarossa Cave, sinkholes like the Juessee and the Schwimmende Insel, depressions, moor landscapes like the Teufelsbäder, karst springs like the Rhumequelle and the Teufelsloch, disappearing streams and subterranean rivers like the Bauerngraben and gypsum rocks.

External links
Homepage of the Karst Trail 
Panorama view of the path 
Osterode map section
Nordhausen map section
Mansfeld-Südharz map section
Kyffhäuser map section

Hiking trails in Germany
Karst formations of Germany
Tourist attractions in Lower Saxony
Tourist attractions in Saxony-Anhalt
Osterode (district)